The Bronislaw Malinowski Award is an award given by the US-based Society for Applied Anthropology (SfAA) in honor of Bronisław Malinowski (1884–1942), an original member and strong supporter of the Society. Briefly established in 1950, the award has been presented annually since 1973.

It is given to an outstanding senior scholar in recognition for a lifetime commitment to the application of the social sciences to contemporary social issues. The acceptance addresses of the awardees are usually published in the society's journal, Human Organization.

Past recipients of the Malinowski Award

See also

 List of anthropology awards

References

Anthropology awards
Bronisław Malinowski
Awards established in 1950
1950 establishments in the United States